The Rolling Bridge is a type of curling moveable bridge completed in 2004 as part of the Grand Union Canal office and retail development project at Paddington Basin, London.

Design

The Rolling Bridge was conceived by Thomas Heatherwick. It consists of eight triangular sections hinged at the walkway level and connected above by two-part links that can be collapsed towards the deck by hydraulic cylinders mounted vertically between the sections. When extended, it resembles a conventional steel and timber footbridge, and is 12 metres long. To allow the passage of boats, the hydraulic pistons are activated and the bridge curls up until its two ends join, to form an octagonal shape measuring one half of the waterway's width at that point.

The bridge won the British Constructional Steelwork Association's British Structural Steel Design Award.

"Rolling" as a name and as a type

Traditional use of the term "rolling bridge" dates from at least the Victorian era, and is used to describe a type of retractable drawbridge used to span a ditch or moat surrounding a fortification. That type of bridge is not hinged, and remains horizontal when it is rolled inside the gates of a fort. Modern versions are called retractable bridges or thrust bridges. One particular version of the rolling bridge type was known as the Guthrie rolling bridge, examples of which may still be seen at Fort Nelson, Portsmouth. Certain types of bascule bridges roll on an arc; an example is the  Pegasus Bridge.

Operation
The bridge is scheduled to unfold across the canal every Wednesday and Friday at noon and every Saturday at 2pm.

See also 
 Merchant Square Footbridge
 List of bridges in London

References

External links 
 Rolling Bridge by Sándor Kabai, the Wolfram Demonstrations Project
 Meccano model of Heatherwick's Rolling Bridge by Alan Wenbourne
 Simulation Rolling Bridge made FreeBasic by Xkrouhn
 2D animation made with SMath Studio

Moveable bridges
Pedestrian bridges in London
Bridges completed in 2004
Thomas Heatherwick
Articles containing video clips
English inventions